The ACTRU Premier Division is a rugby union club competition based in Canberra, Australia, and conducted by the region's governing body, the ACT and Southern NSW Rugby Union. It contains four Senior Grades of competition plus Colts, and is competed by the seven ACT Premier Division clubs, plus ADFA, which fields teams in Colts and 3rd Grade only. First Grade teams compete for the John I Dent Cup. The silver cup, which was first played for in 1938, was a gift to the union by the pastoralist John I Dent. The competition finals are now held at Viking Park.

Premier Division clubs

John I Dent Cup winners

See also

Rugby union in the Australian Capital Territory
List of Australian club rugby union competitions

References

External links
 ACT Competitions

Sports competitions in Canberra
Rugby union competitions in Australia
Rugby union in the Australian Capital Territory
Recurring sporting events established in 1973
1973 establishments in Australia
Sports leagues established in 1973